Bülent Tüfenkci (born 1 January 1966) is a Turkish politician from the Justice and Development Party (AKP) was the Minister of Customs and Trade from 2015 in the third government of Ahmet Davutoğlu. He was also a Member of Parliament for the electoral district of Malatya since 7 June 2015. His surname is sometimes spelt 'Tüfekçi', without an 'n'.

Early life and career
Bülent Tüfenkci was born in Yeşilyurt, Malatya Province on 1 January 1966. He completed his primary education there and graduated from Yeşilyurt Imam Hatip school, before going on to study at the Ankara University Faculty of Law. After graduating from university in 1984, Tüfenkci completed a master's degree, specialising in customs law.

Political career
Tüfenkci participated in the establishment of the Justice and Development Party (AKP) Malatya branch, serving in numerous positions until 2011. He became the provincial President of the AKP's Malatya Branch in 2011, serving until 2015. He was elected as a Member of Parliament for the electoral district of Malatya in the June 2015 general election and was re-elected in the November 2015 general election.

Minister of Customs and Trade
After the AKP won a parliamentary majority in the November 2015 election, Tüfenkci was appointed as the Minister of Customs and Trade by Prime Minister and AKP leader Ahmet Davutoğlu, who formed his third cabinet on 24 November 2015. His appointment was approved by President Recep Tayyip Erdoğan on the same day. He succeeded Cenap Aşçı, who has served as Customs and Trade Minister in the interim election government between 28 August and 17 November 2015. Ruhsar Pekcan took over in 2018.

See also
25th Parliament of Turkey
26th Parliament of Turkey

References

External links
MP profile on the Grand National Assembly website
Collection of all relevant news items at Haberler.com

Living people
1966 births
People from Yeşilyurt, Malatya
Deputies of Malatya
Members of the 25th Parliament of Turkey
Members of the 26th Parliament of Turkey
Members of the 64th government of Turkey
Members of the 65th government of Turkey
Justice and Development Party (Turkey) politicians
Ankara University alumni
Ministers of Customs and Trade of Turkey